The Koamu (Guwamu) were an indigenous Australian people of the state of Queensland.

Language
The Koamu language, often classified as a dialect of Bidjara, appeared to be quite similar to that spoken by the Ualarai, and some early ethnographers such as R. H. Mathews confused the two for this reason.

Country
They were on the Balonne River starting south of St. George, as far as Angledool, Hebei, and Brenda. Their western terrain extended to Bollon and Nebine Creek. Dirranbandi also was part of their territory. According to Thomas Honery, an authority on the nearby Weilwan, the Koamu also lived around the Warrego. This was rejected by Norman Tindale as beyond their western frontier.

Mythology
On dying, a Koamu is met on passing into the spirit world by his yuri or totem, who then reintroduces him to all of his relations, the natural species belonging to his moiety.

The first bee was fashioned by a bat, which gummed on some cockatoo feathers to a sticky milky weed, which immediately took wing, and flew right down to Koamu territory, with the bat in hot pursuit, until it won sanctuary in a cave called Ungwari. The Koamu undertook rituals in this cavern to secure the increase of bees in their area.

Native title

The descendants of the Koamu, under the name the Kooma people, had their native title rights recognized by the state of Queensland in 2014.

Alternative names
 Guamu, Guwamu, Oamu
 Kuam
 Kuamu

Source:

Notes

Citations

Sources

Aboriginal peoples of Queensland